The 2021–22 season was Southampton's 10th consecutive season in the Premier League and the 105th season in existence. This season, the club participated in the Premier League, FA Cup and EFL Cup. The season covers the period from 1 July 2021 to 30 June 2022.

Squad

 Ages as of the end of the 2021–22 season

|}

Transfers
Players transferred in

Players loaned in

Players transferred out

Players loaned out

Players released

Pre-season friendlies
Southampton announced two pre-season matches against Cardiff City and Swansea City for 27 July and 31 July respectively, on 2 July. Further friendlies were announced with a behind closed doors friendly against Fulham confirmed for 24 July and Athletic Bilbao to visit St Mary's Stadium on 7 August. On 25 July, a further friendly against Levante was confirmed for 4 August.

Competitions

Premier League

League table

Results summary

Results by matchday

Matches
The league fixtures were revealed on 16 June 2021.

FA Cup

The Saints entered the competition in the third round and were drawn away to Swansea City. On 9 January 2022, the Saints were drawn at home to Coventry City in the fourth round. On 6 February 2022, the Saints were drawn at home to West Ham United in the fifth round. On 3 March 2022, the Saints were drawn at home to Manchester City in the quarter finals.

EFL Cup

The Saints entered the competition in the second round and were drawn away to Newport County. On 25 August, the draw for the third round was completed, with the Saints drawn away to Sheffield United. On 22 September, the draw for the fourth round was completed, with the Saints drawn away to Chelsea.

Squad statistics

Most appearances

Top goalscorers

References

Southampton
Southampton F.C. seasons